Langkawi International Maritime and Aerospace Exhibition (LIMA) is a maritime and aerospace exhibition that takes place once every two years in Langkawi, Malaysia. The last event took place in 2019.

The event is one of the largest maritime and aerospace exhibitions in the Asia-Pacific, and is focused mainly on the defence industry, but also supports civilian industries. In 2013, LIMA recorded an overall growth of 10%, with 433 exhibitors from 31 countries, 333 defence delegations from 38 countries, 632 media personnel from 127 agencies, 68 ships and 78 aircraft attending the show. The 5 day event also saw 38,421 trade visitors from both defense and commercial sectors from all around the world, as well as 135,691 public visitors.

The exhibitors involved in the event exhibit their products inside the purpose built Mahsuri International Exhibition Centre (MIEC), adjacent to the terminal at Langkawi International Airport. The maritime exhibitions take place at Resort World Langkawi while the aerospace exhibitions take place at the Langkawi International Airport. The venues are all in close proximity to each other.

The event is supported by the Malaysian government and industry associations.

History
LIMA began in 1991 with slightly over 100 exhibiting companies with the aim of making Langkawi the venue for light and experimental aircraft to fly unhampered by heavy traffic, modeled after the EAA Air Venture in the United States. LIMA has now expanded into maritime exhibitions and is also one of Asia-Pacific's largest maritime and air exhibitions. Nowadays, a four-hour flying display is held daily throughout the show.

LIMA 2003 
The LIMA '03 exhibition generated business totaling RM 2.182 Billion (US$575 million) through 30 contracts, letters of offer and acceptance or intent and memorandums of understanding.

LIMA 2005 
LIMA 05' witnessed a signing of RM4 billion worth of contracts in maritime and aerospace items. According to the then Defence Minister Datuk Seri Haji Najib Razak that the amount included defense contract RM3.2 billion, letters of offer worth RM403 million and letters of intent worth RM344 million. Najib Razak said that a major portion of the contracts sealed this time was related to the purchase of A400M aircraft for the Royal Malaysian Air force which amounted to RM2.8 billion including the equipment.

LIMA 2007 
LIMA 07' was the successor to LIMA 05'. The air and maritime exhibition mainly consisted of the same concepts.

LIMA 2013

The annual Langkawi International Maritime and Aerospace 2013, was launched on 27 March 2013. The show kicked off with a display of air stunts by the Royal Malaysian Air Force. Among the VIPs who were present was Raja Muda of Perlis Tuanku Syed Faizuddin Putra Jamalullail, Raja Puan Muda Tuanku Hajah Lailatul Shahreen Akashah Khalil and their two children.

LIMA 2013 recorded an overall growth of 10%. 433 exhibitors from 31 countries, 333 defence delegations from 38 countries, 632 media personnel from 127 agencies, 68 ships and 78 aircraft attended the show. The 5 day event also saw 38,421 trade visitors from both defense and commercial sectors from all around the world, as well as 135,691 public visitors.

Daily airshows and maritime stunts were staged for visitors. The shows are done by local and foreign army personnel. Vehicles included Zodiac and CB90 boats, Super Lynx and Fennec helicopters. The MMEA showcased its Kilat and Petir boats with their Agusta Westland, Dauphin and Bombardier aircraft.

LIMA 2013 was hoped to be the cleanest exhibition ever as the organizers had hired a firm with 150 workers to conduct the cleaning and waste managing throughout the event.

LIMA 2013 witnessed the signing of 24 contracts that amounted to 4.271 billion, boosting the Malaysian defense technology industry.

LIMA 2015 

The event was inaugurated on 17 March 2015 and concluded on the 21st. Dassault Aviation had a successful bid, the Malaysian Government expressed interest in buying some of the Dassault Rafale jets.

LIMA 2017 

LIMA 2017 saw over 180,000 visitors, compared to about 175,000 visitors during LIMA 2015, it is expected that there will be a 10% larger crowd during LIMA 2019. LIMA 2017 recorded 555 exhibitors from 36 countries, compared to 512 from 36 countries in LIMA 2015. The value of contracts and agreements signed this time also rose to about RM3.7bil, an increase of 81% from the RM2bil, while 12 memorandums of understanding, 11 contracts, seven letters of agreement and five letters of intent signed were signed.

LIMA 2019 
Prime minister Mahathir launched LIMA 2019 after regained his power. He also launched the first edition of LIMA back in 1991 when he was the 4th Prime Minister.

LIMA 2023 
Defence minister Hishammuddin Hussein announced that LIMA 2023 will be held on 23 to 27 May 2023. Around 600 exhibitors from 20 countries are expected to take part in this edition.

References

External links

LIMA 2017
LIMA 2019
LIMA Resort Langkawi

1991 establishments in Malaysia
Air shows in Malaysia
Exhibitions in Malaysia
Recurring events established in 1991